Penny Racers may refer to:

Choro-Q, Japanese toy line released in the US as Penny Racers
Penny Racers (Nintendo 64), a 1999 video game for the Nintendo 64